Bonggi (Banggi) is an Austronesian language spoken primarily by the Bonggi people of Banggi Island, off the northern tip of Sabah, Malaysia.

Orthography

Vowels and diphthongs
 a – ,  unstressed
 e – 
 i – 
 o – 
 u – 
 aa – 
 ee – 
 ii – 
 oo – 
 uu – 
 ai – 
 ou –

Consonants
 b – ,  between vowels,  before u
 d – ,  before i
 f – 
 g – ,  before u
 h – ,  before i,  at the end of a word
 j – 
 k – 
 l – ,  before i
 m – 
 n – 
 ng – 
 p – 
 r – 
 s – 
 t – 
 w – 
 y – 

At the ends of words, k, p, and t are not released.

References

Further reading

 

Northeast Sabahan languages
Languages of Malaysia
Endangered Austronesian languages